Three Island Crossing State Park is a history-focused public recreation area in Glenns Ferry, Elmore County, Idaho, United States, that interprets the site of a ford of the Snake River on the Oregon Trail. The state park features camping, cabins, disk golf, and a visitors center with interpretive exhibits.

History
The land was deeded from the city of Glenns Ferry to the Idaho Department of Parks and Recreation in 1968 and was formally opened to the public as a state park in 1971.

Wildlife
Residential animals of this state park feature deer, waterfowl, fox, swans, songbirds, pelicans, eagles.

See also

 List of Idaho state parks
 National Parks in Idaho

References

External links

Three Island Crossing State Park Idaho Parks and Recreation 
Three Island Crossing State Park Map Idaho Parks and Recreation

State parks of Idaho
Oregon Trail
Protected areas established in 1968
Protected areas of Elmore County, Idaho
Snake River
1968 establishments in Idaho